Shir Khvoshi-ye Sofla (also Romanized as Shīr Khvoshī-ye Soflá; also known as Shīr Khvosī, Shīrkhvosī-ye Pā’īn, and Shīrkhvoy-e Soflá) is a village in Poshtkuh-e Rostam Rural District, Sorna District, Rostam County, Fars Province, Iran. At the 2006 census, its population was 39, in 7 families.

References 

Populated places in Rostam County